This article lists important figures and events in Malayan and Malaysian public affairs during the year 1963, together with births and deaths of significant Malaysians. The Federation of Malaya merged with Singapore, North Borneo, and Sarawak to form the Federation of Malaysia on 16 September.

Incumbent political figures

Federal level
 Yang di-Pertuan Agong: Tuanku Syed Putra of Perlis
 Raja Permaisuri Agong: Tuanku Budriah of Perlis
 Prime Minister: Tunku Abdul Rahman Putra Al-Haj
 Deputy Prime Minister: Datuk Abdul Razak
 Lord President: James Beveridge Thomson

State level
  Johor
Sultan of Johor: Sultan Ismail 
Menteri Besar of Johor: Hassan Yunus
  Kedah
Sultan of Kedah: Sultan Abdul Halim Muadzam Shah 
Menteri Besar of Kedah: Syed Omar Bin Syed Abdullah Shahabuddin
  Kelantan 
Sultan of Kelantan: Sultan Yahya Petra
Menteri Besar of Kelantan: Ishak Lotfi Omar
  Perlis
Raja of Perlis: Tuanku Syed Sirajuddin (Regent)
Menteri Besar of Perlis: Sheikh Ahmad Mohd Hashim
  Perak 
 Sultan of Perak:Sultan Yusuf Izzuddin Shah (until 4 January)
 Sultan Idris Shah II (from 5 January)
 Menteri Besar of Perak: Shaari bin Shafie
  Pahang
 Sultan of Pahang: Sultan Abu Bakar
 Menteri Besar of Pahang: Wan Abdul Aziz bin Engku Hj Abdullah
  Selangor
 Sultan of Selangor: Sultan Salahuddin Abdul Aziz Shah
 Menteri Besar of Selangor: Abu Bakar Baginda
  Terengganu
 Sultan of Terengganu: Sultan Ismail Nasiruddin Shah (Deputy Yang di-Pertuan Agong)
 Menteri Besar of Terengganu: Ibrahim Fikri bin Mohammad
  Negeri Sembilan
 Yang di-Pertuan Besar of Negeri Sembilan: Tuanku Munawir
 Menteri Besar of Negeri Sembilan: Mohd Said Bin Muhammad
  Penang
 Yang di-Pertua Negeri (Governor) of Penang: Raja Tun Uda
 Chief Minister of Penang: Wong Pow Nee
  Malacca
 Yang di-Pertua Negeri (Governor) of Malacca:Tun Leong Yew Koh (until August)
 Tun Haji Abdul Malek bin Yusuf (from August)
 Chief Minister of Malacca: Abdul Ghafar bin Baba
  Sarawak
 Yang di-Pertua Negeri (Governor) of Sarawak: Tun Abang Haji Openg
 Chief Minister of Sarawak: Stephen Kalong Ningkan
  Sabah
 Yang di-Pertua Negara (Governor) of Sabah: Tun Datu Mustapha
 Chief Minister of Sabah: Fuad Stephens
  Singapore
 Yang di-Pertuan Negara (Governor) of Singapore: Tun Yusof Ishak
 Prime Minister of Singapore: Lee Kuan Yew

(Source: Malaysian Department of Informations)

Events 
 21 March – Freedom from Hunger campaign was commemorated on a Malayan stamp.
 May – A&W's first store in Asia Pacific and Malaysia opened at Kuala Lumpur's Batu Road.
 June – Shah Alam was established as a planned city.
 26 June – The Cameron Highlands Hydroelectric Scheme was established.
 27 July – The Indonesia–Malaysia confrontation began. War broke out.
 11 March – The National Language Act 1963 was gazetted.
 31 August – The Muzium Negara (National Museum) officially opened.
 16 September – The Federation of Malaysia was formed through the merging of the Federation of Malaya and the British crown colonies of Singapore, North Borneo and Sarawak.
 7:30am – Proclamation of Malaysia ceremonies were held in Kuala Lumpur (Peninsula Malaysia), Singapore, Kuching (Sarawak) and Kota Kinabalu (Sabah).
 3 October – The 4th World Orchids Conference was held in Singapore.
 26 October – Sultan Idris Shah was installed as the 33rd Sultan of Perak.
 4 November – The 9th Commonwealth Parliamentary Conference was held in Kuala Lumpur.
 14 November – The National Zoo of Malaysia (Zoo Negara) was officially opened.
 21 November – The Malaysian Houses of Parliament officially opened.
 22 November - Malayan Film Unit (MFU) renamed as Filem Negara Malaysia (FNM).
 28 December – The launch of Television Malaysia by Tunku Abdul Rahman.

Births
 7 July – Jamal Jamaluddin – Sinar FM radio announcer

Deaths
 4 January – Sultan Yussuff Izzuddin Shah of Perak
 12 January – Tun Leong Yew Koh, 1st Yang di-Pertua Negeri of Malacca (1957–1959) and former Minister of Justice (1959–1963)
 9 May – Charles Vyner Brooke – The last White Rajah of Sarawak
 6 November – Dato' Suleiman Abdul Rahman, ex-Minister of the Interior and former Malaysian High Commissioner to Australia (1961–1963)

See also 
 1963
 1962 in Malaysia | 1964 in Malaysia
 History of Malaysia

References

 
Years of the 20th century in Malaysia
Malaysia
Malaysia